Philippe Clément du Vault de la Valrennes (born 1647 - died 12 October 1707) was a French military officer. He was captain of the Normandy Regiment and captain of the colonial troops in New France from 1685 to 1693.

Biography
Philippe Clément du Vault de la Valrennes was born in Normandy, France in 1647. He later enlisted in the French Royal Army and was transferred to New France. Valrennes subsequently participated in the 1691 Battle of La Prairie, when he defeated Major Pieter Schuyler and his militia and First Nation allies, during King William's War. He died on 12 October 1707.

See also
 Normandy
 New France

References

1647 births
1707 deaths
People of New France
Persons of National Historic Significance (Canada)